"Free the People" is a song by Australian band Sherbet. It was released in October 1971 as the second single from Sherbet's debut studio album Time Change... A Natural Progression. The song charted at number 33 on Go-Set and number 18 on the Kent Music Report.

Written by US singer/songwriter Barbara Keith, the song has been recorded by Keith herself (1970), Delaney and Bonnie (1970), Barbra Streisand (1971), Olivia Newton-John (1974) and others.

Track listing

Charts

Personnel 
 Alan Sandow – drums, percussion, bongoes, chimes
 Daryl Braithwaite – lead vocals, tambourine, tabla 
 Clive Shakespeare – guitar, vocals 
 Garth Porter – keyboards, clavinet, piano, lead vocals, backing vocals, Hammond organ, electric piano, synthesiser

References 

Sherbet (band) songs
1971 singles
1971 songs
Festival Records singles
Song recordings produced by Pat Aulton
Infinity Records singles